The Baker Hotel is a hotel in Mineral Wells, Texas. The Baker Hotel was placed on the National Register of Historic Places in 1982.

History

Origin

The story of the Baker Hotel began in 1922, when citizens of Mineral Wells, concerned that noncitizens were profiting from the growing fame of the community's mineral water, raised $150,000 in an effort to build a large hotel facility owned by local shareholders. They solicited the services of prominent Texas hotel magnate Theodore Brasher Baker, who gained fame by designing and building such grand hotels as the Baker Hotel in Dallas and the Hotel Texas in Fort Worth, and managed the Connor Hotel in Joplin, Missouri.

Architect Wyatt C. Hedrick based the hotel design on the Arlington Hotel in Hot Springs, Arkansas, which was known for its water and baths. Construction began on the hotel in 1926, but was stopped after Mr. Baker made a trip to California, where he visited a hotel with a swimming pool, and decided the new Baker Hotel must have one in the front of the hotel. The swimming pool was placed on top of an already-completed basement, which was used as a work area for the hotel and a changing area for guests. An Olympic-sized pool to be filled with the curing mineral waters, it was the first swimming pool built at a hotel in Texas.

Construction began the following year on the grand and opulent structure, which was described by Palo Pinto County historian John Winters as a "Spanish Colonial Revival, Commercial Highrise." It would rise 14 stories over Mineral Wells, and house 450 guest rooms, two ballrooms, an in-house beauty shop, and other novelties such as a bowling alley, a gymnasium, and an outdoor swimming pool. Completed three years later with a cost of $1.2 million, the mammoth building instantly dominated the city skyline.

The 1930s: a top-tier spa destination

The Baker Hotel opened to the public on November 9, 1929, and celebrated with a grand-opening celebration gala two weeks later on November 22. It boasted extravagant creature comforts such as an advanced hydraulic system that circulated ice water to all 450 guest rooms, lighting and fans controlled by the door locks that shut off and on automatically when the guest left or arrived in their rooms, and a valet compartment where guests could deposit soiled laundry that was accessible by hotel staff without them ever even having to enter the guest's room. 

The hotel was fully air conditioned by the 1940s, which added to its appeal as a top-notch convention attraction, offering a meeting capacity of 2,500 attendees, a remarkable number considering that Mineral Wells was home to only about 6,000 residents in 1929. Though it opened mere days after the 1929 stock market crash, the Baker enjoyed immense success throughout the 1930s, largely due to Mineral Wells's growing reputation as a top-tier health spa destination. 

Several notable celebrities made the Baker a temporary home during their visits to the city's health spas; the star-studded guest list included Glenn Miller, Lawrence Welk, Clark Gable, Judy Garland, future U.S. President Lyndon B. Johnson, and even The Three Stooges. It is even rumored by local historians that legendary outlaws Bonnie Parker and Clyde Barrow may have spent a night or two at the Baker.

The 1940s: war brings prosperity 

T.B. Baker began to suffer financial difficulties in the early 1930s, eventually declaring bankruptcy in 1934. He passed control of the Baker Hotel to his nephew Earl Baker, who had served as the hotel's manager, as well as managing director of Baker's Gunter Hotel in San Antonio. Despite its owner's financial problems, the Baker Hotel continued to thrive throughout the mid-1930s. 

As the decade came to a close, however, Mineral Wells's reputation as a health spa was in decline; advances in modern medication and the discovery of antibiotics such as penicillin began to lead local doctors, who had been encouraging patients to partake in the area's therapeutic waters, to invest more confidence in medicine. 

Business began to suffer, until a second boom in the Baker's popularity began when Camp Wolters (the future Fort Wolters military base) opened nearby in October 1940. It was home to the largest infantry placement in World War II and the hotel enjoyed its greatest popularity and success as a result; throughout World War II, the transient and permanent population of Mineral Wells hovered near 30,000, a large number of them making their temporary homes in the Baker.

The 1950s–1970s: decline and abandonment

Camp Wolters was shut down in 1946, one year after World War II ended, and nearby business suffered as a result. A smaller renaissance came in 1951 when the camp was reopened as Fort Wolters, a military helicopter training base. The Baker Hotel hosted the Texas Republican Party conventions in 1952 and 1955, and the Texas Democratic Party held their convention at the Baker in 1954. 

Aside from these successes, business declined steadily through the 1950s and the proverbial final nail was driven by Earl Baker himself when he announced that he would be closing the hotel after the passing of his 70th birthday in 1963. True to his word, Baker shuttered the building on April 30 of that year, bringing an end to 34 years of service to Mineral Wells and surrounding areas. 

The hotel reopened two years later, in 1965, when a group of local investors leased the structure from the Baker family, but the revival was brief and marred by the death of Earl Baker of a heart attack in 1967 after he was found unconscious on the floor of the cavernous Baker Suite. 

In 1972, the Baker closed its doors for the last time. Although several groups had made offers to rehabilitate the structure, the building remained abandoned until 2019, when it was announced that the Baker Hotel would finally be renovated and restored.

2019 restoration plans
In 2014, citizens of Mineral Wells approved a measure to allocate a portion of the city's sales tax to the renovation project that will provide up to $4 million for the $65 million project.

On June 20, 2019, the Baker was announced to have been bought by DFW-based investor Laird Fairchild along with other partners, who had secured the last of the funding needed for the restoration.

Plans were announced in August 2019 for the Baker Hotel Development Partners to purchase and reopen the Baker with a proposed renovation budget of $65 million. Plans call to enlarge the current 450 rooms and bring the total number of rooms down to 165. The second floor will still be maintained as a luxury mineral spa.

The $65 million renovation plan has begun, and the Baker Hotel is projected to reopen in 2025.

Popular culture

The Baker Hotel was featured on the December 7, 2012, episode of Ghost Adventures.
It was also featured on the July 21, 2010, episode of Celebrity Ghost Stories with a story of actor Eric Balfour’s alleged paranormal experiences at the hotel. After this episode,  he was also featured on the September 10, 2016, season five, episode six of The Haunting of... Eric Balfour. On March 25th, 2022, Country Singer William Clark Green released an album "Baker Hotel".

Photo gallery

See also

National Register of Historic Places listings in Palo Pinto County, Texas

References

External links

Baker Hotel photographs and ephemera, hosted by the Portal to Texas History
"Ballad of The Baker" documentary
Baker Hotel Historic Renovation, Fort Worth Business Press, August 25, 2010
Current website for the Baker Hotel, pulled May 2020

Hotel buildings completed in 1929
Hotels established in 1929
Hotels in Texas
Hotel buildings on the National Register of Historic Places in Texas
Landmarks in Texas
Buildings and structures in Palo Pinto County, Texas
Reportedly haunted locations in Texas
National Register of Historic Places in Palo Pinto County, Texas
1929 establishments in Texas
Chicago school architecture in Texas